John Elias (Arabic: جون إلياس; born 10 December 1963) is a Lebanese-Australian former professional rugby league footballer and coach. During the 1980s and 1990s he played for clubs in Sydney, Brisbane, England and France where he also coached. Elias also played and coached for the Lebanon national team.

Background
Elias was born in Beirut, Lebanon. As a child, along with his two older brothers and sister, he was taken by his mother to Sydney following the death of his father. There he became an Australian citizen.

Playing career

1980s
After starting his first grade career with the Newtown Jets in their final season in 1983, Elias then played for the South Sydney Rabbitohs in 1984. The following season he moved north, and in the 1985 Brisbane Rugby League season's grand final for the Wayne Bennett-coached Souths Magpies, Elias was named man-of-the-match for his performance in a shock 10-8 victory over Wally Lewis' Wynnum-Manly Seagulls.

Elias joined the Canterbury-Bankstown Bulldogs in 1986 but departed from the club mid-way through the season to join the Western Suburbs Magpies. Early in the 1987 Winfield Cup season, Elias was sent off for a high tackle in a match against North Sydney Bears. He joined the Eastern Suburbs Roosters in 1988. Early in the 1988 Winfield Cup season while playing for Easts, Elias' jaw was fractured in a tackle during the first minutes of a match against Balmain. Part-way through the 1989 NSWRL season, he left Eastern Suburbs to join the Balmain Tigers club, where he stayed until 1994.

1990s
Elias left Balmain to re-join the Rabbitohs mid-way through the 1994 Winfield Cup season. That season Elias was involved in a match-fixing plot that involved four players from his Souths team and four players from Wests. Elias was jailed for nine months in 1995 after pleading guilty in the NSW District Court to two counts of supplying amphetamines, one count of possessing F1 sub-machinegun parts and one count of possessing prohibited articles, namely military-style flak vests. Elias was the inaugural captain of the Lebanese rugby league team when they made their début in the 1997 World Sevens tournament, going on to reach the quarter-finals. He later travelled to France to play for Avignon and Toulouse.

Elias was diagnosed with stomach cancer in 1999 at age 38, but postponed chemotherapy to play an international match for Lebanon against France. Later he underwent surgery to remove a tennis-ball sized lymphoma which had burst inside his stomach, forcing him into retirement.

Coaching career
Instead of being Lebanon's captain for their campaign to join the 2000 World Cup, he served as their coach. Elias was refused entry into the United States for Lebanon's 2000 World Cup qualifier match due to his previous firearms conviction. Elias coached French club Pia Donkeys in 2002 and 2003, taking them from last in the competition to runners-up, before returning to Australia.

In 2004 Elias was facing up to 25 years in jail after a jury found him guilty of maliciously shooting his business partner in the leg. He ended up serving four years in prison. In 2008, following Elias' release from prison, it was reported that he and Arthur Beetson, who had advised Elias during the 2000 World Cup, were preparing a bid for a rugby league coaching job in Europe. In June 2009, following the conviction of Greg Bird, Elias wrote an article published by News Limited detailing his time in prison. That year Elias coached Lebanon in the 2009 European Cup tournament.

After football
In 2010 Elias published his book, Sin Bin: The Untold Story of a True Footy Bad Boy, which detailed his life of football and crime. In the 2011 pre-season, he was arrested under suspicion of involvement in the 2010 spot fixing case perpetrated by Ryan Tandy, but was found not guilty.

In August 2014 Elias was found guilty of assault and given a five-month suspended jail sentence.

References

1963 births
Living people
Australian expatriate rugby league players
Australian expatriate sportspeople in France
Australian people convicted of assault
Australian rugby league coaches
Australian rugby league players
Balmain Tigers players
Baroudeurs de Pia XIII coaches
Canterbury-Bankstown Bulldogs players
Expatriate rugby league players in France
Lebanese emigrants to Australia
Lebanese rugby league players
Lebanon national rugby league team captains
Lebanon national rugby league team coaches
Lebanon national rugby league team players
Leigh Leopards players
Limoux Grizzlies players
Newtown Jets players
Rugby league players from Sydney
Rugby league second-rows
South Sydney Rabbitohs players
Souths Logan Magpies players
Sporting Olympique Avignon players
Sportsmen from New South Wales
Sportspeople of Lebanese descent
Sydney Roosters players
Toulouse Olympique players
Western Suburbs Magpies players